Peter van Toorn (1944 – October 6, 2021) is a Canadian poet, whose 1984 collection Mountain Tea was a shortlisted finalist for the Governor General's Award for English-language poetry at the 1984 Governor General's Awards.

Born in the Netherlands, Van Toorn moved to Canada with his family as a child. He attended McGill University, and taught for almost 30 years at John Abbott College. He published the collections Leeway Grass (1970) and In Guildenstern County (1973) and edited the anthologies Cross/cut: Contemporary English Quebec Poetry (1982) and The Insecurity of Art: Essays on Poetics (1982), prior to the publication of Mountain Tea. He published no new work following Mountain Tea, although Mountain Tea itself was reissued in 2003 by Véhicule Press.

Works 

 Leeway Grass. Montreal: Delta Canada, 1970.
 Love Song. New York: Doctor Generosity Press, 1970.
 Four Montreal Poets (by Peter Van Toorn, Marc Plourde, Arty Gold, & Richard Sommer; edited by David Solway). Fredericton, NB: Fiddlehead Poetry Books, 1973.
 In Guilderstern County. Lasalle, QC: Delta Canada, 1973.
 Mountain Stick. Montreal: Versus, 1976.
 Mountain Tea, and other poems. Toronto: McClelland and Stewart, 1984. 
 Mountain Tea. Montreal: Véhicule Press, 2003.

References

1944 births
20th-century Canadian poets
Canadian male poets
Writers from Montreal
Dutch emigrants to Canada
McGill University alumni
Canadian educators
Living people
20th-century Canadian male writers